Dayton Township in the U.S. state of Iowa may refer to:

Dayton Township, Bremer County
Dayton Township, Butler County
Dayton Township, Cedar County
Dayton Township, Chickasaw County
Dayton Township, Iowa County
Dayton Township, Webster County
Dayton Township, Wright County

See also
Dayton Township (disambiguation)
Iowa township disambiguation pages